Benjamin Jones (2 January 1882 – 20 August 1963) was a British track cycling racer who competed in the 1908 Summer Olympics.

In 1907, he won the one and five mile events at the British Empire cycling championships at Newcastle.  Soon after, his professional cyclist license was revoked after an altercation with another cyclist.  His attendance at the 1908 Olympics was thus in question until he was finally reinstated just before the event.

In 1908 he won the gold medal in the 5000 metres competition as well as in the team pursuit as member of the British team. He also won a silver medal in the 20 kilometres event. He competed in the 660 yards competition but was eliminated in the semi-finals. In the sprint event he participated in the final and came second, but the pre-arranged time limit was exceeded, resulting in the race being declared void and no medals being awarded.

References

External links
 
 
 
 

1882 births
1963 deaths
English male cyclists
English track cyclists
Olympic cyclists of Great Britain
Cyclists at the 1908 Summer Olympics
English Olympic medallists
Olympic gold medallists for Great Britain
Olympic silver medallists for Great Britain
Sportspeople from Wigan
Olympic medalists in cycling
British emigrants to South Africa
Medalists at the 1908 Summer Olympics